Below is the list of current satellite television channels in Kannada language, a Dravidian language widely spoken in the South Indian state of Karnataka. Apart from those in the below list, many other Kannada channels exist that are limited to certain cities or districts, run by local cable TV operators.


State Owned Channel

General Entertainment

Defunct Entertainment Channels

Movies

Music

Comedy

Kids

Infotainment & Lifestyle

Spiritual

Sports Channels

News Channels

Defunct News Channels

High-Definition Channels

There are currently 4 High-Definition channels in Kannada.

See also

Media in Karnataka
List of Kannada films
List of Kannada magazines
List of Kannada newspapers
List of Kannada radio stations
List of 4K channels in India
Lists of television stations in India
Lists of global television channels

References

Kannada
 
Kannada language